A sgabello is a type of stool typical of the Italian Renaissance. An armchair with armrests usually was a chair (sedia) of hieratic significance. Sgabelli were typically made of walnut and included a variety of carvings and turned elements. The legs could be either two decorated boards with a stretcher for support, or three separate ornamented and carved impost legs. This seat was often placed in hallways, carved with a family's imprese or emblem drawn from its coat-of-arms. Its primary purpose was decorative, therefore the seat was not necessarily comfortable.
Similar chairs were made in France, where they were known as a side chair. These had solid supports called rhombus seat supports. They were not used as stools.

Gallery

External links
Encyclopædia Britannica article
Rijksmuseum.nl

Chairs
Renaissance art